Grand Funk Railroad (shortened to Grand Funk) is an American hard rock band formed in 1969. The band is most notable for their peak in popularity during the 1970s. Grand Funk has released 13 studio album, 4 live albums, 8 albums and 25 singles.

Albums

Studio albums

Live albums

Compilation albums

Singles

Notes

References

 
Discographies of American artists
Rock music group discographies